Umudu is a village on the west coast of New Ireland, Papua New Guinea. It is located to the south of Rasirik and Matakan Mission. In 1990 it had a population of 152. It is located in Namatanai Rural LLG.

References

Populated places in New Ireland Province